Drake University Law School is a professional graduate law school of Drake University, located in Des Moines, Iowa. The school has over 330 full-time students. The school is led by Dean Jerry Anderson. Founded in 1865, Drake Law School is one of the 25 oldest law schools in the country. 

The Law School was established by Iowa Supreme Court justices George Wright and Chester Cole, who aimed to teach law in proximity to the courts so students could witness the law in action. 

Drake Law School's curriculum includes the nation's only First-Year Trial Practicum. In 2020, the American Bar Association ranked Drake University the 7th best competition school in the nation. In 2020, the U.S. News & World Report ranked Drake Law School as the 105th best overall law school in the nation.

History

Established in 1865 by Chester C. Cole, a justice of the Iowa Supreme Court, Drake Law School is one of the 25 oldest law schools in the country and the second law school founded west of the Mississippi River after the University of Iowa, which Justice Cole co-founded with Justice George G. Wright. Justice Cole felt that having a law school located in the state capital would be advantageous. In time, Drake Law alumni would fill the ranks of all branches of Iowa local and state government.

Programs
In addition to the full-scale, three-year, Juris Doctor program, the law school features the following special programs:
 Drake Law Review
 Drake Journal of Agricultural Law
 5 Research Centers: Agricultural Law, Children's Rights, Constitutional Law, Intellectual Property, and Legislative Practice
 Certificate programs in several fields
 Civil and Criminal Clinical Programs
 Multiple Moot Court and Mock Trial teams
 Summer in France Program
 Summer Institute in Constitutional Law (for entering 1L's)
 LL.M./M.J. Program in Intellectual Property
 M.J. Program in Health Law
 LL.M./M.J. Program in Individualized Legal Studies (Concentrations in: Business Law, Criminal Law, Estate Planning, Family Counseling and the Law, Human Rights and Global Citizenship, Legislative Practice and Government Relations, Sustainable Development)

Opperman Lecture Series

The Dwight D. Opperman Lecture series, endowed by the former CEO of West Publishing and Drake Alumnus, is an annual event of national importance in constitutional law. Several Supreme Court Justices have visited campus to deliver lectures on American jurisprudence.

Drake Law Review
As of 2014, the Drake Law Review is nationally ranked among the top 40 law journals for the number of times courts have cited its articles. The rankings, compiled by John Doyle of the Washington and Lee Law School Library, show the Drake Law Review had 56 citations, according to the 2014 data. Drake is in the top group of more than 1,640 journals in the rankings.

The Drake Law Review is published quarterly by Drake Law students.  In the past few years, the Drake Law Review has published articles by  distinguished legal scholars and judges, including:  Erwin Chemerinsky, Cass Sunstein, Randy Barnett, Cheryl Harris, Paul Brest, Stephen Carter, Michael Gerhardt, Chief Justice John G. Roberts Jr., and Stephen Rapp (Chief Prosecutor of the United Nations Special Court for Sierra Leone).

The Drake Law Review increased its online presence in 2015 with a new website. The site hosts articles, notes, and lectures published in the pages of the Drake Law Review. In addition, this site is home to Discourse, an online journal founded in 2012 by the Drake Law Review.

Notable alumni

Drake Law has graduated numerous significant lawyers, including several state/federal judges and politicians, including:
 Turner W. Bell, pioneering black criminal defence attorney
 Mark W. Bennett, former federal judge for the Northern District of Iowa
 Robert D. Blue, former governor of Iowa
 Terry Branstad, former and longest-serving governor of Iowa, former U.S. Ambassador to China
 Mark Cady, former chief justice of the Iowa Supreme Court 
 Russell C. Davis, United States Air Force lieutenant general
 George Gardner Fagg, United States federal judge on the United States Court of Appeals for the Eighth Circuit
 Adam Gregg, current Iowa lieutenant governor
 James E. Gritzner, federal judge for the Southern District of Iowa since 2002
 John Alfred Jarvey, former federal judge for the Southern District of Iowa from 2007 to 2022
 Daniel Jay, former member of the Iowa House of Representatives
 Gary Lambert (politician), former New Hampshire state senator
 Louis A. Lavorato, former chief justice of the Iowa Supreme Court
 Dustin Manwaring, member of the Idaho House of Representatives
 Brian Meyer, member of the Iowa House of Representatives
 C. Edwin Moore, former chief justice of the Iowa Supreme Court
 Jim Nussle, former member of the U.S. House of Representatives and Director of the Office of Management and Budget
 Dwight D. Opperman, former CEO of West Publishing Company
 James W. Porter, chief justice of the Idaho Supreme Court
 Robert D. Ray, former governor of Iowa
 Neal Smith, former member of the U.S. House of Representatives
 Marsha Ternus, former chief justice of the Iowa Supreme Court
 Jack Whitver, current Iowa state senator and Senate Majority Leader
 David Wiggins, former justice of the Iowa Supreme Court

Employment 
According to Drake's official ABA-required disclosures, 68.4% of the Class of 2015 obtained full-time, long-term, bar passage required jobs 10 months after graduation.  5% of the Class of 2015 was unemployed 10 months after graduation.

Costs
The total cost of attendance (indicating the cost of tuition, fees, and living expenses) at Drake for the 2014-2015 academic year is $58,146. The Law School Transparency estimated debt-financed cost of attendance for three years is $214,740.   The average amount actually borrowed in law school by 2013-14 JD graduates at Drake Law School was $108,857.  Drake Law School offers both guaranteed and conditional scholarships, that latter of which depend upon the student maintaining a specific grade point average, rather than remaining in good academic standing.  Conditional scholarships are controversial because courses are often graded on a strict curve.  During the 2014-2015 academic year, 21 Drake law students had their conditional scholarships reduced or eliminated.

References

External links
The Drake University Bulletin Volume 7, Issue 1, (Drake University Law School history), Drake University, 1903.

Law schools in Iowa
Drake University
Educational institutions established in 1865
1865 establishments in Iowa